Amritchandra (f. 10th-century CE) was a Digambara Jain Acharya who wrote commentaries on Samayasāra called Atmakhyati and Samaysar Kalasha, Pravachanasara and Pancastikayasara. He also wrote independent books of Puruşārthasiddhyupāya and Tattvartha Sara. He wrote in Sanskrit language.

References

Citations

Sources
 
 

10th-century Indian writers
Sanskrit scholars
Jain acharyas
Year of death unknown